Jeremiah Williams may refer to:
 Jeremiah Norman Williams, U.S. Representative from Alabama
 Jeremiah Williams (British politician), Welsh barrister and politician
 Jeremiah M. P. Williams, Reconstruction era Mississippi politician